Connor James (born August 25, 1982) is a Canadian former professional ice hockey centre. He most recently played with the Straubing Tigers of the German Deutsche Eishockey Liga (DEL).

Playing career
James was drafted in the ninth round, 279th overall, by the Los Angeles Kings in the 2002 NHL Entry Draft. James played for 4 years for the University of Denver and won one NCAA National Championship with the Pioneers. He appeared in two National Hockey League games with the Kings in the 2005–06 season.

James then signed with the Pittsburgh Penguins organization prior to the 2006–07 season. The following season while called up to the Penguins on February 16, 2008,  Conner scored his first NHL goal against Rick DiPietro of the New York Islanders.  In September 2008, the Penguins cut James from the active roster for the 2008–09 season, returning to affiliate the Wilkes-Barre/Scranton Penguins. On March 25, 2009, James was named the 14th captain in team history.

On July 31, 2009, James signed for Augsburger Panther of the DEL. After a season with the Panthers and two following seasons with the DEG Metro Stars, James signed for his third DEL team, with a one-year contract with the Thomas Sabo Ice Tigers on May 7, 2012. He spent three seasons with the Ice Tigers, before moving to fellow DEL side Straubing Tigers for the 2015–16 campaign.

Career statistics

Awards and honors

References

External links 

1982 births
Living people
Augsburger Panther players
Bakersfield Condors (1998–2015) players
Canadian ice hockey centres
DEG Metro Stars players
Denver Pioneers men's ice hockey players
Ice hockey people from Calgary
Los Angeles Kings draft picks
Los Angeles Kings players
Manchester Monarchs (AHL) players
NCAA men's ice hockey national champions
Pittsburgh Penguins players
Straubing Tigers players
Thomas Sabo Ice Tigers players
Wilkes-Barre/Scranton Penguins players
Canadian expatriate ice hockey players in Germany